The Borough of Newcastle-under-Lyme is a local government district with borough status in Staffordshire, England.

It is named after the town of  Newcastle-under-Lyme, where the council is based, but includes the town of Kidsgrove and villages of Silverdale, Chesterton, Madeley, Halmerend, Keele and Audley. Most of the borough is part of The Potteries Urban Area.

History

The present town is originally a Roman settlement. In the Middle Ages there was a large castle here, owned by John of Gaunt, and a major medieval market. In 1835 Newcastle-under-Lyme Municipal Borough was one of the boroughs reformed by the Municipal Corporations Act 1835 which required that rate payers elected councillors.  In 1932 it took in what had been the Wolstanton United Urban District, covering the parishes of Chesterton, Silverdale and Wolstanton, also taking the parish of Clayton from Newcastle-under-Lyme Rural District.

The district was formed on 1 April 1974, under the Local Government Act 1972, as a merger of the Newcastle-under-Lyme Municipal Borough, the Kidsgrove Urban District, and Newcastle-under-Lyme Rural District.

Up to the time of the passing of the Municipal Reform Act an election of a mock mayor occurred annually after the election of the real mayor.

Wards

Since the 2018 council election the borough has contained 21 wards.

Previously the borough had contained 24 wards.

Politics

The borough council has traditionally been dominated by the Labour Party.  However, in the 2006 local elections a coalition of Conservative and Liberal Democrat councillors gained a majority.

The United Kingdom Independence Party (UKIP) also made gains in 2007 and 2008 but in 2011 and 2012 losing all seats they were defending, including their group leader, Derrick Huckfield.

The council was led between 2006-2011 by Conservative Councillor Simon Tagg. Stephen Sweeney served as the Conservative leader from  2011-2012.

The Labour Party regained its majority on the council in 2012, which it held until 2017.

After the 2012 Local Elections there were 33 Labour party councillors, 11 Liberal Democrats and 16 Conservatives.

After the 2014 election results Labour retained their majority on the council, down one to 32 seats. The Conservatives retained their position as the largest opposition party with 16 seats. Both UKIP and the Green party made gains, five seats and one seat respectively mainly at the expense of the Liberal Democrats losing five seats bringing their total to six.

As of 12 April 2022, the political make-up of the local council was as follows:

Demographics

In the 2001 census, the borough was recorded as having a population of 122,030 with 51.5% being female. 78.% identified themselves as Christian, 13.1% having no religion, 0.5% Muslim,  0.2% Hindu or other and 0.1% stating Jewish or Sikh. 61.2% were classed as economically active, with 22.6% working in manufacturing, 18.5% in wholesale or retail, 11.6% in health/social work and 11.6% in financial and other business related activities.

Education
Newcastle-under-Lyme was chosen for the campus of University College of North Staffordshire, established in 1949 at Keele Hall in the village of Keele, two miles from the town centre, and which was granted full university status as Keele University in 1962. Keele University Medical School is based in the grounds of the University Hospital of North Staffordshire at Hartshill in Stoke-on-Trent, about a mile from the centre of Newcastle-under-Lyme.

Freedom of the Borough
The following people, military units and organisations and groups have received the Freedom of the Borough of Newcastle-under-Lyme.

Individuals
 Gordon Banks : 23 February 2018.

Military units
 The Staffordshire Regiment: 1973.

Organisations and Groups
 The Royal Stoke University Hospital: 22 May 2021.

References

External links 
 Newcastle-under-Lyme borough council
 Newcastle-under-Lyme local life
 The Potteries
 Historic chartered accountants based on Chesterton
 Keele University
 Local Information from The Sentinel newspaper
 Staffordshire and Stoke-on-Trent Archive Service

 
Non-metropolitan districts of Staffordshire
Boroughs in England